Good News (also known as The Good News) is an American sitcom that aired on UPN from August 25, 1997, to May 19, 1998. The series was the final television series produced by MTM Enterprises, which was folded into 20th Century Fox Television, in 1997 (MTM's then-remaining programs, Good News and The Pretender (1996–2000), were produced by 20th Century Fox Television for the rest of their runs).

Synopsis
The series focused on David Randolph (David Ramsey), a young acting pastor designated to Compton, California's African American Church of Life. Initially, the majority of the church's members balk at the young pastor's new position and resent him replacing their former pastor. With the help of the church's secretary, Vera Hudson (Rose Jackson Moye), Randolph attempts to reunite the church and help his congregation.

Other cast members included Roz Ryan as Hattie, the church's cook, Tracey Cherelle Jones as the church's youth director, Guy Torry as a choir member and janitor.

Cast
 David Ramsey as David Randolph
 Roz Ryan  as Hattie Dixon
 Tracey Cherelle Jones as Cassie Coleman
 Jazsmin Lewis as Venita Stansbury
 Guy Torry as Little T
 Alexia Robinson as Mona Phillips
 Rose Jackson Moye as Vera Hudson (pilot only)

Episodes

References

External links
 
 

1997 American television series debuts
1998 American television series endings
1990s American black sitcoms
1990s American sitcoms
English-language television shows
Television shows set in Compton, California
American television spin-offs
UPN original programming
Television series by MTM Enterprises
Religious comedy television series